Miss America 1963, the 36th Miss America pageant, was held at the Boardwalk Hall in Atlantic City, New Jersey on September 8, 1962 and was broadcast on CBS.

Eight years later, winner Jacquelyn Mayer of Ohio suffered a near-fatal stroke at age 28. She spent years in rehabilitation, and thereafter dedicated herself to volunteer work with stroke patients.

Results

Order of announcements

Top 10

Top 5

Awards

Preliminary awards

Other awards

Contestants

References

External links
 Miss America official website

1963
1962 in the United States
1963 beauty pageants
1962 in New Jersey
September 1962 events in the United States
Events in Atlantic City, New Jersey